Sophia Minnaert (born July 23, 1987) is an American journalist and the broadcast and digital features content director for the Milwaukee Brewers.

Fox Sports Wisconsin 
In 2012, Minnaert was hired by Fox Sports Wisconsin (FSW) to work in their social media department. Starting in 2013, she began as an on-air sideline reporter for FSW. During her time at the network, she worked both Brewers and Milwaukee Bucks telecasts. However, following her hire by the Brewers in June 2018, Minnaert's role with the Bucks ended.

Accolades 
She won an Emmy in 2013 for the documentary Baseball in the Dominican Republic.

Personal life
Minnaert is from Madison. In 2009, she graduated from Marquette University, where she studied Spanish and journalism. Her mother is from Costa Rica and her father, Al Minnaert, is a well-known former Madison Edgewood High School football coach.

References

Living people
People from Madison, Wisconsin
Marquette University alumni
Milwaukee Brewers announcers
Milwaukee Bucks announcers
American television sports anchors
Major League Baseball broadcasters
National Basketball Association broadcasters
1987 births